Des Benson (November 1921 – January 2007) was a Gaelic footballer who played for the Cavan county team.

Playing career
Des Benson was a goalkeeper for Cavan in the 1940s and he was considered to be one of the most underrated player of Cavan's glorious period. He won an All-Ireland Minor Football Championship medal in 1938. He was Cavan's reserve goalkeeper in the squad that won the All-Ireland Senior Football Championship Final in the Polo Grounds, New York in 1947. He played in All-Ireland Final the following year against Co. Mayo. His memorable save against Kerry helped the Blues achieve their first National Football League title in 1949/50. He was also on the first University College Dublin team ever to win the Dublin championship.

References

1921 births
2007 deaths
Cavan inter-county Gaelic footballers
Gaelic football goalkeepers